Chris Wills (born 17 February 1978 in Folkestone, Kent) is a British gameshow contestant who became the 47th series champion of Countdown in 2002 and a veteran of numerous other shows.

Countdown
Wills first appeared on Countdown on 14 January 2002, winning all eight of his heat games and becoming the #1 seed of his series, including the highest ever score in 20 years of Countdown, 129, on 17 January. He beat two more contestants to reach the final where he beat Tom Hargreaves 110-67. He averaged 110 points per game.

Wills was invited back to the "Champion of Champions" tournament, where he won three successive games including a score of 120 to reach the final against Graham Nash. The final was a tense, low-scoring game and he lost 79-73. Since recording this game, he has made three further appearances on Countdown, against Julian Fell, the player that beat his highest ever score of 129, and against Conor Travers, the youngest ever series winner at 14 years old. He lost both of these games.

In 2013, Wills returned to Countdown as one of the 41 contestants taking part in the 30th Birthday Championship. After defeating Martin Bishop in the first round, he lost to eventual runner-up Jack Hurst in the next round.

Other television appearances 
Wills is a veteran of numerous other game shows, appearing on 15-to-1 before appearing on Countdown, and later winning The Weakest Link, taking away prize money of £2,540. He appeared on BrainTeaser and reached the final after beating three other contestants, but after failing to solve the anagram TANTRIC + E (INTERACT), he failed to win any money. He also appeared on Mastermind. In 2008 he appeared on 1 vs. 100 and eliminated 99 of his 100 opponents, but again left the studio with no money. He appeared on the first edition of A Question of Genius on 16 March 2009 and won £5,000 by correctly identifying The Smiths' song title which contains a spelling mistake ("Cemetry Gates") and remained at the top of the leader board throughout the series, earning a place in the grand final. Although he only finished joint third in the final, he was the series' joint biggest money winner with £5,000. He also appeared on the 14th episode of the third series of Pointless.

Political career
Wills was elected as a Labour councillor in Manchester's Withington ward in 2016.

External links
Interview with Chris
Chris' final against Tom
The 11th Champion of Champions final
Chris Wills entry on Countdown Wiki

Contestants on British game shows
Countdown (game show)
1978 births
Living people
People from Folkestone